Feroleto Antico is a comune and town in the province of Catanzaro in the Calabria region of Italy.

Transport 

A railway bridge between here and Marcellinara was washed away by flood waters in 2011.

References 

Cities and towns in Calabria